Cardinale Giovanni Panico General Hospital is a big medical center in Tricase, Apulia.

History 
The hospital was officially founded in 1967 from Marcelline's sisters of Tricase for will of Cardinale Giovanni Panico.

Before the opening, till 1961, the hospital was a very important college for medical and nurse formation in Italy, Albania and America. The first project for the hospital was introduced in Lisbon in 1963.

The first brick was put in 1963 from Giuseppe Zocco. After the building of the body, the chief of the department of surgery of Nardò civil hospital stopped the building because the body didn't respect the standard for a perfect work; so after six months the buildings restart and the hospital was opened on 1 October 1967, and the first patients came on a week after.

Some years after the hospital became a regional teaching hospital and one of the most important religious hospital in Europe. In the following years the hospital was enlarged and was added all the wards.

Today Cardinale Panico Hospital is a reference point for neurological disorders, hematology, pediatric oncology and hematology and rare diseases.

References

Hospitals in Apulia
Hospitals established in 1967
1967 establishments in Italy
Tricase